Ronald Leslie Aston (23 July 1901 – 7 September 1969) was an Australian physicist and civil engineer.

Aston was born in Burwood, New South Wales, and attended Newington College (1912-1918) and the University of Sydney. He taught civil engineering at the University of Sydney from 1930 until 1966. In 1956 he was appointed associate professor. Earlier he had been physicist on the Imperial Geophysical Experimental Survey from 1929 until 1930 and had tutored at the University of Melbourne in 1928 and 1929.

Aston was President of the Royal Society of New South Wales in 1948.

References

External links
Aston, Ronald Leslie (1901 - 1969) at Bright Sparcs, University of Melbourne
Curdie, John, 'Aston, Ronald Leslie (1901–1969)', Australian Dictionary of Biography, Volume 13, MUP, 1993.

1901 births
1969 deaths
20th-century Australian engineers
Australian Methodists
People educated at Newington College